Craspedisia spatulata is a species of comb-footed spider in the family Theridiidae. It is native of the Dominican Republic.

References

Theridiidae
Spiders described in 1948